Bendemeer is a subzone within the planning area of Kallang, Singapore, as defined by the Urban Redevelopment Authority (URA). Its boundary is made up of the Pan Island Expressway (PIE) in the north; Serangoon Road, the Kallang River, Sungei Whampoa and Bendemeer Road in the east; Lavender Street and Balestier Road in the south; and the Central Expressway (CTE) in the west.

Bendemeer is primarily residential, consisting of both public housing built by the Housing and Development Board (HDB) and private housing. Educational institutions within this subzone include Hong Wen School, Bendemeer Primary School, Bendemeer Secondary School and Northlight School.

Other notable places within Bendemeer include Boon Keng MRT station along the North East line, Kwong Wai Shiu Hospital, Kallang Community Club, Kallang Neighbourhood Police Post, Boon Keng Fire Post, Sri Lankaramaya Buddhist Temple and Central Sikh Temple. The Kallang Polyclinic is also sited within this subzone.

References

External links

Places in Singapore
Central Region, Singapore
Kallang